Dul Bid (also Romanized as Dūl Bīd and Dūlbīd; also known as Dūl Bīd-e Vosţá) is a village in Mirbag-e Jonubi Rural District, in the Central District of Delfan County, Lorestan Province, Iran. At the 2006 census, its population was 64, in 12 families.

References 

Towns and villages in Delfan County